Ye Jianming (born 23 February 1977) is the founder and former chairman of CEFC China Energy Company Limited, a now defunct company that used to be a Global Fortune 500 energy and finance conglomerate. He has been under detention in China since March 2018 on charges of bribery.

Prior to its bankruptcy, CEFC China under Ye's leadership was ranked 229 on the Fortune Global 500 List in 2016 and had a workforce of over 30,000. During his tenure, CEFC China funded the establishment of the Hong Kong-based think tank China Energy Fund Committee (CEFC), an NGO in Special Consultative Status with the Economic and Social Council of the United Nations.

In April 2015, Ye became an economic advisor to the Czech President Miloš Zeman.

CEFC bribes for oil
In November 2017, the US Justice Department accused CEFC of offering a US$2 million bribe to the president of Chad for oil rights and, through its representatives, former Hong Kong Secretary for Home Affairs Patrick Ho and former Senegalese foreign minister Cheikh Gadio, depositing a US$500,000 bribe to an account designated by the Minister of Foreign Affairs of Uganda. The energy fund denied authorising Ho to engage in corrupt practices. In December 2018, Ho was convicted in a US federal court on seven counts of bribery and money laundering, following a trial in which Gadio stood as a witness for prosecutors.

Investigation
Ye was detained and put under investigation in March 2018 on suspicion of economic crimes. According to South China Morning Post and AsiaNews, the order for the investigation came from Chinese Communist Party general secretary Xi Jinping. Shanghai Guosheng Group, a portfolio and investment agency controlled by the Government of Shanghai, subsequently took control of CEFC China Energy in March 2018. In October 2018, it was reported that prosecutors alleged Wang Sanyun, former Communist Party Secretary of Gansu province, had accepted bribes from Ye Jianming in 2011.

References

1977 births
Living people
Chinese chief executives
Billionaires from Fujian
People from Nanping
Businesspeople from Fujian
Chinese company founders
Businesspeople in the oil industry